Sepiddasht (also Romanized as Sepīd Dasht; also known as Īstgāh-e Sepīd Dasht and Sefīd Dasht) is a city in and capital of Papi District, in Khorramabad County, Lorestan Province, Iran. At the 2006 census, its population was 3,197, in 683 families.

References

Towns and villages in Khorramabad County
Cities in Lorestan Province